Acid techno, sometimes known generally as "acid", is a genre of techno that was derived from acid house and developed in Europe in the late 1980s to early 1990s. It saw younger artists apply the "squelching" synthesizer sound of Chicago acid house to harder-edged techno material.

Characteristics
The acid style was obtained largely through Roland instruments, most prominently the TB-303 bass synthesizer. The term Acid specifically refers to the harsh "acidic" squelching sound of the Roland 303. The acid sound is achieved by turning up the filter resonance and turning down the cutoff frequency parameters of the synthesizer, along with programming the 303's accent, slide, and octave parameters; manipulating the filter in real-time as the track is being recorded is a technique known as tweaking.

In addition to acid records imported from the US, the style was influenced by sources such as hardcore, German trance, and Belgian rave music.

History
Early exponents of the style included Richie Hawtin (aka Plastikman), Aphex Twin, Dave Clarke, Hardfloor, solarquest, and Damon Wilde. Other mainstays included London acts such as Liberators, Henry Cullen (aka D.A.V.E. The Drummer), Guy McAffer (aka The Geezer), and DDR. In London, the acid techno scene developed via illegal network of parties; the 1997 compilation It's Not Intelligent…And It's Not From Detroit…But It's F**king 'Avin It was subtitled "The Sound of London's Acid Techno Underground" and helped to solidify the genre in the underground consciousness. In recent years, Acid Techno had a comeback with artists of the younger generation such as Regal or Boston 168 releasing critically acclaimed Acid music and bringing the sound to big stages.

See also 
Acid breaks

References

External links
 Old School Acid Techno, Some Old School Acid Techno tracks
 AcidTechno.co.uk, Acid Techno.co.uk
 Acid Tekno, Acid Magazine

20th-century music genres
Techno genres